Carlos Gerena Allende (born January 12, 1971) is a Puerto Rican former professional boxer who competed from 1993 to 2003, twice challenging for the WBC super featherweight title in 1998 and 1999. As an amateur, he won a silver medal at the 1991 Pan American Games.

Amateur career 
1990 Competed as a Flyweight at 1990 Goodwill Games in Seattle
Lost to Dzhambulat Mutayev (Soviet Union) PTS
1991 Bantamweight Silver Medalist at Pan-American Games in Havana
Defeated Catalino Becerra (Panama) TKO 2
Defeated Javier Calderon (Mexico) PTS
Lost to Enrique Carrion (Cuba) points
1992 Competed as a as a Featherweight at the Olympic Games in Barcelona
Defeated Narendar Singh (India) PTS
Lost to Hocine Soltani (Algeria) PTS

Professional career 
Gerena's most notable accomplishment was defeating Jesús Chávez of Mexico by split decision on January 7, 1995—early in both of their careers. Chávez avenged the loss on March 22, 2003 with a TKO victory in round 6. Gerena also fought against notable world champions Genaro Hernandez and Floyd Mayweather Jr.

Gerena won minor titles such as the WBA Latin, WBA Fedelatin, and WBC Continental Americas super featherweight titles throughout his career. His record was 38-6 (30 KOs). Before his professional career he represented his native country at the 1992 Summer Olympics in Barcelona, Spain.

See also 
 Puerto Rican-Mexican boxing rivalry

External links 
 

1971 births
Boxers at the 1991 Pan American Games
Boxers at the 1992 Summer Olympics
Super-featherweight boxers
Living people
Olympic boxers of Puerto Rico
Sportspeople from Bayamón, Puerto Rico
Puerto Rican male boxers
Pan American Games silver medalists for Puerto Rico
Pan American Games medalists in boxing
Competitors at the 1990 Goodwill Games
Medalists at the 1991 Pan American Games
20th-century Puerto Rican people